Wakeling is an English surname. Notable people with the surname include:

Alan Wakeling (1926–2004), American magician and inventor
Brandon Wakeling (born 1994), Australian weightlifter
Dave Wakeling (born 1956), English singer-songwriter and musician
Denis Wakeling (1918–2004), Anglican bishop
Gwen Wakeling (1901–1982), American costume designer
Jason Wakeling (born 1968), New Zealand sport shooter
John Wakeling (born 1979), English cricketer
Mark Wakeling (born 1971), English actor
Nick Wakeling (born 1971), Australian politician
Steve Wakeling (born 1983), English kickboxer

English-language surnames